National Significant Numbers (NSN):

Minimum number length (excluding the country code): three digits
Maximum number length (excluding the country code): seven digits

Format: +685 XX XXX or +685 XX XX XX or +685 XXX XXXX

Numbering allocation in Samoa
Number range allocation in Samoa is as follows:

See also 
 Telecommunications in Samoa

References

Samoa
Communications in Samoa